A Man About the House is a British drama film directed by Leslie Arliss and released in 1947. The film is a melodrama, adapted for the screen by J. B. Williams from the 1942 novel of the same name by Francis Brett Young. A theatrical adaptation A Man About the House by John Perry had been staged in London's West End in 1946, with Flora Robson as Agnes, Kieron Moore as Salvatore, and Ernest Thesiger as Sanctuary. The film was produced by Edward Black and edited by Russell Lloyd, with cinematography by Georges Périnal and music by Nicholas Brodszky. Shot at Shepperton Studios and on location around Naples, the film's sets were designed by the art director Andrej Andrejew.

Plot
Two impecunious English sisters, Ellen and Agnes Isit (Dulcie Gray and Margaret Johnston), unexpectedly inherit a Neapolitan villa from a deceased uncle and move to Italy to view and sell their property. A local man, Salvatore (Kieron Moore), has, since a boy, been employed by the deceased uncle becoming major domo and he now manages the villa and its vineyard. Exploring her late uncle's studio, Ellen uncovers a painting of a nude Salvatore as Bacchus.

Soon Ellen becomes drawn to the carefree life of the locals and the romantic charisma of Salvatore, while the prudish Agnes resists. During the raucous revelry of the grape-treading festival, Agnes succumbs to her suppressed desire. Rushing to the balcony she cries out for Salvatore who drops a local woman he's kissing and climbs from the grape vat and to her bedroom.  The pair are quickly married and husband Salvatore now is master of the estate.

Soon, Ellen becomes aware of a change in Salvatore's behaviour towards Agnes.  Not long after the marriage, Agnes's health begins to deteriorate and Ellen's suspicions are aroused.  She expresses her concerns to a visiting English doctor, Benjamin Dench (Guy Middleton) who is Agnes's former fiance. Ellen is convinced that Agnes is being poisoned.  She enlists Dench's help in trying to prove that Salvatore is slowly murdering her sister with arsenic.  The villa once belonged to Salvatore's family and he has long been determined to regain ownership. Having poisoned his employer to inherit, he had not anticipated the sisters' arrival on the scene.

The film culminates in a clifftop struggle between Salvatore and Dench, who beats Salvatore and tells him to flee to America at once or face the consequences. Ellen and Dench return to the villa to tend the sickened and weak Agnes. Suddenly they learn that Salvatore is dead. His body is brought from the bay by villagers, having cast himself from the clifftop in despair rather than lose his family's former property. Ellen and Dench, who have fallen in love, depart together to England and leave the recovered Agnes, who is determined to remain at the villa and to fulfil her dead husband's wishes, tending the vineyard.

Cast
 Dulcie Gray as Ellen Isit
 Margaret Johnston as Agnes Isit
 Kieron Moore as Salvatore 
 Guy Middleton as Dr. Benjamin Dench
 Felix Aylmer as Richard Sanctuary
 Lilian Braithwaite as Mrs. Armitage
 Reginald Purdell as Higgs
 Wilfred Caithness as Solicitor
 Gina Lollobrigida as a young girl
 Jone Salinas as Maria
 Marisa Finiani as Assunter
 Fulvia De Priamo as Gita
 Nicola Esposita as Antonina
 Andreas Malandrinos as Peasant
 Philip Ridgeway as Polite Man
 Victor Rietta as Railway Porter

References

 TimeOut Film Guide - published by Penguin Books -

External links 
 
 
Review of film at Variety

1947 films
1940s historical drama films
British historical drama films
British black-and-white films
Films about wine
Films directed by Leslie Arliss
Films set in London
Films set in Naples
Films shot in Italy
Films shot at Shepperton Studios
British Lion Films films
London Films films
Films set in the 1900s
Films based on British novels
1940s English-language films
1940s British films